Carmen District may refer to:

 Carmen District, San José, in San José Canton, San José Province, Costa Rica
 Carmen District, Cartago, in Cartago Canton, Cartago Province, Costa Rica

District name disambiguation pages